Saudehornet or Sauehornet is a mountain that is located  north of the village of Ørsta in the municipality of Ørsta, Møre og Romsdal, Norway. The  is a very popular, though steep, destination for skiing in the Sunnmørsalpene range.

See also
List of mountains of Norway

References

External links
 Annual autumn race (running) from Ørsta to the summit
 X2 - Ski festival; race up/down Saudahornet and free-riding competition
 Route
 ski: Saudehornet
 Panorama from Saudehornet at Leif Roar Strand's website

Mountains of Møre og Romsdal
Ørsta